Brocchinia tanimbarensis is a species of sea snail, a marine gastropod mollusk in the family Cancellariidae, the nutmeg snails.

Description

Distribution
This marine species occurs off the Tanimbar Islands, Indonesia.

References

External links
 MNHN, Paris: holotype

Cancellariidae
Gastropods described in 1997